The Soo Michigan Realtors were a Junior "A" ice hockey team from Sault Ste. Marie, Michigan.  This defunct hockey team was a part of the Northern Ontario Junior Hockey League.

Season-by-Season results

Defunct ice hockey teams in the United States